Đông Anh is a township and capital of Đông Anh District, Hanoi, Vietnam.

References

Populated places in Hanoi
District capitals in Vietnam
Townships in Vietnam